The Electronic AppWrapper (EAW) was an early commercial electronic software distribution catalog.

Originally, the AppWrapper was a traditional printed catalog, which later developed into the Electronic AppWrapper, offering electronic distribution and software licensing for third party developers on NeXT systems. AppWrapper #4 App Store app ran on NeXT, HP-PA RISC, Intel and SUN Sparc and was available via the World Wide Web at paget.com. It is considered to be the first app store.

According to Richard Carey, an employee of Paget Press who was present in 1993, the Electronic AppWrapper was first demonstrated to Steve Jobs by Jesse Tayler at NeXTWorld Expo. The EAW went on to receive recognition from Robert Wyatt of Wired magazine and Simson Garfinkel of NeXTWorld magazine.

An interview with Jesse Tayler, the lead engineer and inventor of EAW, discussed the early days of AppWrapper and how the transition to the foundation of the World Wide Web and his program had similarities.

Some software developers with titles on the EAW have continued over the decades and transitioned into the modern Apple Inc. era. Andrew Stone is one example, who designed programs that were available on the EAW and still designs apps for the App Store today.

History
In the early 1990s Paget Press, a Seattle based software distribution company, developed the Electronic AppWrapper which was the first electronic App Store on NeXT. Critically, the application storefront itself is what provides a secure, uniform experience that automates the electronic purchase, decryption and installation of software applications or other digital media.

The Electronic AppWrapper started initially as a paper catalog, which was released periodically. The AppWrapper was a combination of both a catalog and magazine, which listed the vast majority of software products available for the NeXT Computer.

Within the first couple of publications, the AppWrapper began to have a digital counterpart, with the introduction of CD-ROM disks in the back of later issues of what then to be called The Electronic AppWrapper as well as a website at paget.com. EAW is considered the first App Store partly because of Steve Jobs, but because it was the first true application storefront made to search and review software titles. Critically, the storefront application itself provides a standard, secure way to electronically purchase, decrypt and install apps automatically end-to-end.

The Electronic AppWrapper was mostly apps with some music or other digital media, the iTunes Music Store was mostly music and some iPod apps. Apple's Garage Band even purveys digital music lessons using the very same iTunes account as used for the iOS App Store, they are all part of the same App Store. Electronic bookstores such as Kindle, Barnes and Noble or Kobo are further examples of successful electronic distribution using the App Store concept.

For the Electronic AppWrapper distribution, encryption and the digital rights of the software were universally managed for all participating developers much like stores participating in a shopping mall.

Software has always been electronically transferred, and encryption has always been part of computing. 

The introduction of unified commercial software distribution catalog with a true application storefront to collectively manage and provide encryption for apps and media was a seminal invention. This is because by protecting the digital rights of artists online, the App Store provided the first viable economic and instant distribution mechanism which ultimately exploded the pace of software adoption and created an economic boom.

When compared to shipping boxes and printing user manuals, the pace and efficiency provided by the App Store is profound and has changed software distribution forever.

During the early development of the Electronic AppWrapper, it became the first commercial software distribution catalog to allow digital data encryption and provide digital rights management for apps, music and data. This was a tremendous advance for the independent developers who could not possibly access the financial resources to publish software boxes across the country and the world, in order to reach their audience.

The NeXT Computer initially came without a floppy disk drive, which created an urgent need to invent a new form of software distribution. The AppWrapper contained all kinds of various types of software, including general third party applications, music and media. The invention was part of a movement to protect the rights of third party developers and distribute software without the expense of printing manuals and delivering boxes, something that today is seen universally as then norm.

Other advantages of the EAW included levelling the playing field for software distribution. It allowed independent or smaller software companies to distribute their apps quickly, and compete with larger companies with more established distribution channels. The EAW also provided ways that software updates could reach existing customers, something that was uncommon at the time.

The product was first demonstrated to Steve Jobs at the NeXTWorld Expo in 1993. The Electronic AppWrapper received recognition later in the year, with a senior editor at NeXTWORLD Magazine, Simson Garfinkel rated The Electronic AppWrapper 4 3/4 Cubes (out of 5), in his formal review. Also, Paget's Electronic AppWrapper was named a finalist in the highly competitive InVision Multimedia '93 awards in January, 1993 and won the Best of Breed award for Content and Information at NeXTWORLD Expo in May, 1993.

Following the development of the AppWrapper and its subsequent use of the early Internet in its early days, The AppWrapper went on to feature in Wired magazine, where they stated that it was at the time the best way to distribute and license software.

Mechanics
The Electronic AppWrapper operated by taking a percentage of each sale of the software it listed. Due to the scale of the operation in the early days, the price was negotiated individually with each developer.

References

1991 software
Software distribution
NeXT